Gandhi Global Family is United Nations Department of Global Communications accredited Peace NGO which propagates the ideologies of Mahatma Gandhi, Martin Luther King Jr. & Nelson Mandela among youth. It associates itself at enhancing friendship at grass root level, and establish people to people contact throughout the world.

GGF engages youth to participate in activities like debates, quiz, SDGs, leadership programs, adventure trips, mini democratic sessions in State Assemblies and the Parliament.  The scheme of GGF works on events like  "Symposium on Truth and Non-Violence" at school, college and University level in India, "Gandhi Mandela Cricket Peace Series", "Peace rallies" and  "UN Quiz"

GGF tries to identify the local peace messengers throughout the country and recognize their efforts in promoting communal harmony & spreading interfaith beliefs. The NGO undertakes a wide range of social awareness programs  in collaboration with the United Nations India. One such program that is under inception involves 17 schools in each State capital city of the country. The project aims at spreading the messages of United Nations’ 17 Sustainable Development Goals (SDGs) among students community of the country. In addition, the corner stone of such program is to enable the younger generation to join hands towards community welfare and thereby promoting global peace.

In 2020 & 2021, during the ongoing COVID-19 pandemic crisis, Dr S. P. Varma with the help of GGF volunteers formed GGF J&K Covid-19 Relief & Response Team in Jammu & Kashmir and has organized more than 350 relief camps where the organization has distributed grocery kits, immunity booster kits & hygiene kits to migrants and local needy families in the far flung regions of Jammu & Kashmir. On 5 August 2020, Dr S. P. Varma reported Covid positive and was hospitalized along with 4 members of his family including three years old granddaughter Nmami Varma. From the hospital, he announced to organize 150 relief camps in J&K as a perfect tribute to Mahatma Gandhi during his ongoing 150th birth anniversary year. After completing 150 camps on 2 Oct 2020, he has continued the efforts in helping needy people by organising more relief camps. On 25 May 2021, the organisation conducted 350 relief camps in Jammu & Kashmir covering all districts and benefitted over one 1.25 lakh needy people.

Head of Gandhi Global Family 

Ghulam Nabi Azad is Global President of Gandhi Global Family while Dr S. P. Varma is Global Vice President of Gandhi Global Family.

Institutionalized Gandhi Medals 

 Institutionalized Gandhi Doot Medal for students & Gandhi Seva Medal for the grass root workers who are working for the rural communities and have dedicated their life to the Gandhian way of living and created awareness among youth & rural community.
 Decorated Indian Army and Indian Air force Chiefs with "Mahatma Gandhi Award" on 30 January 2006 at Jammu. The awards were presented by then Chief Minister, Ghulam Nabi Azad for their commendable work during the earth – quake calamity (2005) in J&K State.
 The Dalai Lama, President of India Shri K R Narayanan, Monk Ven Phrarajabhavanavisudh, Speaker Lok Sabha Smt Meira Kumar, SAARCLAW Secretary General Hemant Batra,  Director UNIC Mrs Kiran Mehra Kerpelman, YHAI President Shri Harish Saxena . Head of Sant Nirankari Mission Baba Hardev Singh Ji 2013 are decorated with this medal.

References

External links

 GGF's website

Mahatma Gandhi